Bicyclus taenias, the grey bush brown, is a butterfly in the family Nymphalidae. It is found in Senegal, Guinea-Bissau, Guinea, Sierra Leone, Liberia, Ivory Coast, Ghana, Togo, Nigeria, Cameroon, Gabon, the Central African Republic and the Democratic Republic of the Congo. The habitat consists of dense forests.

References

Elymniini
Butterflies described in 1877
Butterflies of Africa
Taxa named by William Chapman Hewitson